Xiang Jingyu (– , née  Xiang Junxian), was one of the earliest female members of the Chinese Communist Party (CCP), widely regarded as a pioneer of the women's movement of China.

Early life
Xiang Jingyu was born in Xupu, Hunan province on 4 September 1895. Her father was Xiang Ruiling, may have been of the Tujia ethnicity, a successful businessman, and her mother was Deng Yugui, who died when Xiang Jingyu was young. She had ten siblings. Xiang Jingyu's one brother, Xiang Xianyue, who had studied in Japan, was a leader of Tongmenghui in West Hunan. Xiang Xianyue founded a primary school in Wenchangge in 1903. Xiang Jingyu (then named Xiang Junxian) attended this school because of the influence of her brother and became the first girl who studied in a school in the imperial era of China.

Xiang Jingyu went to Changsha in 1911 after the downfall of Qing Dynasty with the Xinhai Revolution. She renamed herself Xiang Jingyu and attended the First Provincial Women's Normal School of Hunan, but then left this school and attended Zhou Nan Women's School. In this period, Xiang Jingyu was concerned with state affairs. When the humiliating “Twenty-One Demands” was signed, she and other students made speeches in the streets, hoping to wake the patriotic enthusiasm of Chinese people. After graduating from Zhou Nan Women's School, Xiang Jingyu went back to her hometown. She thought that education could rescue China, so she founded Xupu Primary School under the support of some local progressives. As the principal of this school, she employed some progressive youths as teachers. What the difference was compared to most other schools was that her school taught new knowledge and new ideas. At the beginning, there was only one class and dozens of students. However, the numbers of students expanded quickly and reached up to 300.

When the New Citizen's Academic Association was founded in Hunan by Mao Zedong and Cai Hesen in April 1918, Xiang Jingyu wanted to make a career outside. So Xiang Jingyu went to Beijing, and paid a visit to Mr. Cai Yuanpei, the principle of Peking University. In Beijing, Xiang Jingyu met with Cai Hesen and had a good relationship with him.

In July 1919, Xiang Jingyu was invited by Cai Hesen to go to Changsha, and carry out Hunan's work-study movement in France. On December, Xiang Jingyu, Cai Hesen, Cai Chang, Cai Hesen's mother and other persons went to France and became part-time Chinese students. Xiang Jingyu attended the Montargis Women's University. When she studied in Montargis, she read many of Marx’s works, and developed a belief in Marxism and Communism. In May 1920, Xiang Jingyu married Cai Hesen.

When Xiang Jingyu studied in France, she was concerned with the conditions of the world and China. On 26 May 1920, she wrote about problems with women’s liberation and reforming Chen Duxiu’s magazine New Youth. In this article, she voiced the opinion that women’s liberation must be combined with the remoulding of society.

Road to Revolution
In 1921, part-time students were expelled from France due to a petition for rights of study and living. Xiang Jingyu went back to China in the same year. In February 1922, Xiang Jingyu was accepted by Chinese Communist Party and became one of the earliest female party members. In July, she was elected as the first female member of the CCP Central Committee and became the first director of the party Women's Bureau. She tried to forge links with female laborers, especially in the silk industry. Xiang Jingyu wrote a number of articles to elaborate Chinese women’s problems. In these articles, she called for Chinese women to unite and fight for liberation.

With the establishment of the United Front with Kuomintang in 1923, Xiang became editor of a weekly supplement to The Republican Daily, a Kuomintang newspaper. In June 1923, at the 3rd National People's Congress  Xiang Jingyu was elected as a Central Committee member again and became the first secretary of the Women’s Movement Committee. Xiang drafted the women’s movement bill, which was passed by the Congress, which said one of the key tasks of the party's Women's Bureau was to gain influence over the "general women's movement", including the general suffrage group the Women's Rights Alliance. Some party members condemned working with the group because it was "bourgeois". She was sometimes critical of patriarchal practices within the Communist Party.

In 1924, she led a strike involving about ten thousand female workers from silk factories. Then, Xiang Jingyu founded the Committee of Women's Liberation, and trained many female cadres, who then became a force against feudalism and imperialism.

In January 1925, Xiang Jingyu was once again elected to the Central Committee now for the third time. She played a key role in the strikes and protests of the May Thirtieth Movement of 1925. However, because of an affair with Communist Party member Peng Shuzhi, she was criticized by party members as lacking moral virtue, and was forced to resign her position on the Central Committee and as head of the party Women's Bureau. A political split between Peng, who strongly supported Party Chairman Chen Duxiu, and Cai, who wanted more political autonomy, also played into the situation.

In October, Xiang Jinyu and Cai Hesen were sent to study in Moscow Orient Communist Labor University, where their relationship permanently ended. In March 1927, Xiang Jingyu went back to China. On 12 April, Chiang Kai-shek started his counter-communism war in Shanghai, and Xiang Jingyu decided to flee to Wuhan and work in the Propaganda Department of the Federation of Trade Unions of Wuhan. The Wuhan National Government under Wang Jingwei's administration also expelled the Communists in July. Regardless of danger, Xiang Jingyu stayed on in Wuhan editing the party journal Chang Jiang and helping the workers’ movement and underground Party.

Death
Xiang Jingyu was arrested in the French Concession Sandeli in Wuhan on 20 March 1928 due to the betrayal of members of her group to the police. The French officials turned her over to the Nationalist government in April. On the first of May of the same year, Xiang Jingyu was executed by the police.

See also
 Women's rights#China
 Historical Museum of French-Chinese Friendship

Notes

References
 About Xiang Jingyu (in Chinese): https://web.archive.org/web/20150706131022/http://news.xinhuanet.com/ziliao/2003-01/17/content_693930.htm
 中华女英烈(第一卷)，人民出版社，1981.8,1:28.

1895 births
1928 deaths
Chinese Communist Party politicians from Hunan
Chinese expatriates in France
Chinese women's rights activists
Chinese women in politics
Delegates to the 4th National Congress of the Chinese Communist Party
Delegates to the 5th National Congress of the Chinese Communist Party
Executed Republic of China people
People executed by the Republic of China
Politicians from Huaihua
Republic of China journalists
Republic of China politicians from Hunan
Tujia people
Writers from Hunan